KIDOZ is a Content Discovery network designed for children. The platform is based upon a sophisticated COPPA compliant machine learning technology platform which analyses big data and knows to recommend the most relevant content for each and every kid based on their usage behaviour.

Features 

KIDOZ offer several solutions:
Its stand-alone state-of-the-art Child Mode app which allows children to explore the World Wide Web and the full array of mobile and tablet devices safely. Parents may download the app for free from the Google Play Store and begin to empower their children to explore their interests independently and safely. (https://play.google.com/store/apps/details?id=com.kidoz)

There is a password-protected Parental Control Account for parents to set account parameters. Some of the features of this account are security enhancement and content customisation tools, and the tools for the addition of new content. 

KIDOZ for businesses provides kid developers and publishers an SDK/JS to integrate within their property and begin monetizing safely and easily. The kid-friendly recommendation widget creates engagement with users by offering them more  FREE videos, games, and apps to discover and enjoy. Advertisers may promote their children's content on the network and get exposed to millions of targeted kids and enjoy high conversion rates and positive brand engagement.

The system is designed as a platform for user-generated content. All content is moderated and approved by a moderation team before it is allowed. The system blocks links, scripts and any other attempts that lead to sites and content that have not been approved.

The system is internally developed around what is termed a Smart Content Engine, which filters and individualizes content for users based on certain variables, such as age, gender and languages.

KIDOZ came out of its beta testing phase in May 2009 and v1.0 is available in 30 languages: English, German, Chinese Traditional, Chinese Simplified, French, Greek, Italian, Japanese, Korean, Portuguese, Russian, Spanish, Czech, Dutch, Swedish, Turkish, Polish.

KIDOZ is available as a free download from its maker's website. The current categories are Websites, Videos and Games for children. It has been disclosed that future Freemium versions will include additional features, and that there will be a Premium model, offering certain specialized features at a small monthly fee.

Background 
The KIDOZ Kid's Web Environment Operating System is developed by KIDO'Z Ltd, an Israeli start-up based in Tel Aviv. The CEO is Gai Havkin.

Business Model 

KIDOZ currently follows the Freemium model as the application is available as a free download from the website. Future versions will include additional features, such as e-mail and instant messaging in a closed network. It has been revealed that in the next few months, KIDO’Z will launch its Premium Package that will offer additional tools, services and content.

References

Proprietary operating systems